Dervish Bejah Jakhrani Baloch (1862–1957), also known as Bejah Dervish, or simply Dervish, was a "Afghan" camel driver who played a significant role in the exploration and development of outback Australia, before settling in Marree, South Australia and growing date palms.

Life
Darvish Bejah was born in Baluchistan, then part of British India (since 1947 part of Pakistan).  He served with British forces at Kandahar and Karachi under Lord Roberts, where he attained the rank of sergeant.

He moved to Australia in about 1890, arriving by sailing ship at the port of Fremantle. At that time, communities of so-called Afghan (in fact hailing from a number of countries and ethnicities) cameleers were already established in Australia and involved in exploration and transport, having helped to construct the Overland Telegraph Line and open up the Western Australian Goldfields, amongst other accomplishments.

In 1896 Bejah was engaged by Lawrence Wells to manage the camels used for transport on the ill-fated Calvert Scientific Exploring Expedition to the Great Sandy Desert of north-central Western Australia.

In 1902 he settled in Marree, where he bought land and from where he operated his camel transport business. On 15 December 1909 he married a widow, Amelia Jane Shaw, and around 1930 he retired from camel driving to grow date palms.

On 6 May 1957 he died in hospital at Port Augusta and was buried in the local cemetery.

Recognition
In 1954 Bejah was featured in the award-winning documentary film The Back of Beyond, directed by John Heyer.

Bejah is commemorated by a plaque on the Jubilee 150 Walkway in Adelaide as someone who made a major contribution to the development of South Australia. It reads "Dervish Bejah, c1862-1957, Camel-driver, explorer".

He is lauded in the poem "Afghan" by Douglas Stewart, published in 1955

Descendants
In 1891 he had a son, Ben Murray, with an Aboriginal woman living in Marree, South Australia.

He had a son with his wife Amelia, Abdul Jubbar (Jack). Abdul Bejah, son of Jack and grandson of Dervish, was on the Australian Outback Afghan Camelmen Descendants and Friends Memorial Committee that organised a memorial to the cameleers in Whitmore Square, Adelaide, in 2007.

See also
Afghan (Australia)

References

Further reading
Photographs of Dervish in the State Library of South Australia

1862 births
1957 deaths
Camel drivers
Australian people of Baloch descent
Australian explorers
People from British India